The Whitechapel and St. George's by-election, 1942 was a by-election held on 8 August 1942 for the British House of Commons constituency of Whitechapel and St. George's, which covered Whitechapel, Shadwell, Wapping, and St George in the East in the Metropolitan Borough of Stepney.

The by-election was caused by the death of the constituency's Labour Party Member of Parliament James Henry Hall, who had held the seat since the 1935 general election, having previously been the seat's MP between 1930 and 1931.

In accordance with the war-time electoral pact, neither the Conservative nor the Liberal parties fielded a candidate. Labour's candidate was Stoker Edwards.

There being no other candidates, Edwards was returned unopposed.

Election results

References

See also 
 List of United Kingdom by-elections
 Whitechapel and St. George's constituency
 1930 Whitechapel and St George's by-election

Whitechapel and St Georges,1942
Whitechapel and St Georges by-election
Whitechapel and St Georges by-election
Unopposed by-elections to the Parliament of the United Kingdom (need citation)
Whitechapel and St Georges,1942
Whitechapel and St Georges by-election
Whitechapel